NTEU may refer to:

 National Tertiary Education Union, a trade union representing Australian university employees
 National Treasury Employees Union, a trade union representing employees of the U.S. federal government

See also
 Nei til EU, a Norwegian eurosceptic organisation